Clark's Point is a city in Dillingham Census Area, Alaska, United States. The population was 62 at the 2010 census.

Geography

Demographics

Clark's (or Clarks) Point first appeared on the 1890 U.S. Census as the unincorporated Inuit village of "Stugarok." It would not appear again until 1930, when it returned as Clark's Point, also an unincorporated village. It formally incorporated in 1971.

As of the census of 2000, there were 75 people, 24 households, and 15 families residing in the city. The population density was 23.9 people per square mile (9.2/km2). There were 51 housing units at an average density of 16.2 per square mile (6.3/km2). The racial makeup of the city was 6.67% White, 90.67% Native Alaskan, 1.33% Pacific Islander, and 1.33% from two or more races.

There were 24 households, out of which 33.3% had children under the age of 18 living with them, 45.8% were married couples living together, 16.7% had a female householder with no husband present, and 37.5% were non-families. 25.0% of all households were made up of individuals, and 4.2% had someone living alone who was 65 years of age or older. The average household size was 3.13 and the average family size was 3.93.

In the city, the population was spread out, with 38.7% under the age of 18, 6.7% from 18 to 24, 25.3% from 25 to 44, 21.3% from 45 to 64, and 8.0% who were 65 years of age or older. The median age was 30 years. For every 100 females, there were 114.3 males. For every 100 females age 18 and over, there were 119.0 males.

The median income for a household in the city was $28,125, and the median income for a family was $41,250. Males had a median income of $30,625 versus $41,250 for females. The per capita income for the city was $10,988. There were 20.0% of families and 45.7% of the population living below the poverty line, including 66.7% of under eighteens and 36.4% of those over 64.

Education
It was previously served by the Clarks Point School, operated by the Southwest Region School District. Due to declining enrollment, the school closed in May 2012. The Clark's Point school re-opened in August 2017.

References

Cities in Alaska
Cities in Dillingham Census Area, Alaska
Populated coastal places in Alaska on the Pacific Ocean